Brookwood can refer to:
Brookwood, a shopping center and hospital in Homewood, Alabama 
Brookwood, Alabama, a place in the Tuscaloosa metropolitan area
Brookwood, Surrey, a village in Surrey, England
Brookwood Cemetery, a place in England
Brookwood Hospital near Woking in Surrey
Brookwood Park, a country house later school at Bramdean, near Winchester, Hampshire
Brookwood railway station, in Surrey
Brookwood (Atlanta), a neighborhood in Atlanta, Georgia
Brookwood Hills, a neighborhood in Atlanta, Georgia
Chevrolet Brookwood, a Chevrolet station wagon
 Brookwood Church, a Southern Baptist Megachurch located in Simpsonville, South Carolina

Schools

Brookwood Elementary School, a school in the Hillsboro School District in Hillsboro, Oregon
Brookwood High School (Georgia), a high school in Snellville, Georgia
Brookwood Labor College, a school for progressive labor education in Katonah, New York
Brookwood School, a school in Manchester, Massachusetts